Jurgen Themen (born 26 October 1985) is a Surinamese sprinter who specializes in the 100 metres.

Biography
He competed at the 2007 World Championships, the 2008 Olympic Games and the 2009 World Championships without progressing to the second round.  At the 2012 Summer Olympics he finished first in his preliminary heat, but could only finish fifth in his next heat. At the 2016 Summer Olympics he finished eight in his heat and did not advance. 

His personal best time is 10.38 seconds, achieved at the 2012 Surinamese Olympic Trials. The time was also a new Surinamese national record, breaking the old one of 10.48 seconds.

Personal bests
100 m: 10.13 s (wind: +1.6 m/s) –  Bradenton, 28 May 2016
200 m: 21.25 s (wind: +1.6 m/s) –  Spearfish, 8 May 2016

International competitions

References

External links
Jurgen Themen Olympic athlete profile at London2012.com

1985 births
Living people
Surinamese male sprinters
Athletes (track and field) at the 2008 Summer Olympics
Athletes (track and field) at the 2012 Summer Olympics
Athletes (track and field) at the 2016 Summer Olympics
Athletes (track and field) at the 2007 Pan American Games
Athletes (track and field) at the 2011 Pan American Games
Olympic athletes of Suriname
Sportspeople from Paramaribo
Pan American Games competitors for Suriname
World Athletics Championships athletes for Suriname
Competitors at the 2018 Central American and Caribbean Games
Competitors at the 2011 Summer Universiade